Federico Olivieri (born 5 May 2001) known professionally as Olly is an Italian rapper and singer.

Biography 
Olivieri was born in Genoa, his family later settled in the Foce district. During his early musical studies, he enrolled at the Conservatorio Niccolò Paganini in Genoa, where he studied music and singing.

His musical career began in 2016, when he formed the music collective Madmut Branco, with which he released his first musical project, Piacere Mixtape. The following year, he released his first solo project, the EP Namaste, in collaboration with rapper Matsby, from which the single "Chiara Ferragni" was extracted, in collaboration with Italian singer Alfa.

After a few years of inactivity, during which he moved to the United Kingdom to focus on his studies, Olly resumed releasing music in Italy in 2018. On June 15, of the same year, he released the EP CRY4U, from which the single "Bla-Bla Car" was extracted.

In 2019 he released the singles "Bevi" and "Best Seller" with Alfa, and participated in the track "Black Room Posse" by producers Eames and FJLO. In May, he released "Il primo amore", his first solo hit, which surpassed 100,000 views on YouTube in one week. On October 30, 2020 he announced the release of Io Sono, his third EP containing 7 tracks including the singles "Mai e poi mai" and "Winston Blue", released on November 6.

In 2021, Olly posted a reinterpretation of Arisa's song "La notte" on Instagram. This cover was particularly successful on the platform, so much so that it was later released as a single, titled "La Notte (RMX)", in collaboration with Arisa herself. In the spring of the same year, he obtained his first record deal with the Aleph Records label, distributed by Epic Records for Sony Music. In July 2021, he was named "Artist of the Month" in the MTV New Generation.

Olly manage to qualify in the top six, with his entry "L'anima balla", by rightfully accessing the festival in the  category. "Polvere" was later announced as his entry for the Sanremo Music Festival 2023.

Discography

Extended plays

Mixtape albums

Singles

As featured artist

References 

Italian pop musicians
Italian hip hop musicians
Italian singers
Italian rappers
2001 births
Living people
People from Genoa